Pikes Peak Prep is a free, public K–12 charter school located in downtown Colorado Springs, Colorado. United States.

Pikes Peak Prep is ranked a Performance level school based on the Colorado Department of Education evaluation in 2016. 100% of seniors in 2016 graduated from Pikes Peak Prep, and over 90% of students enroll in college.

In 2012, Pikes Peak Prep received the Governor's Distinguished Improvement Award.

The school offers a Middle College Program, allowing students to earn college credits.
High School students are able to concurrently enroll in college classes at Pikes Peak Community College, and receive both college credit and high school credit. Pikes Peak Prep pays for student's college tuition, provides transportation, and books.

This school changed locations after management of the school was changed in an agreement with Colorado Charter School Institute.

References

External links
 

Charter schools in Colorado
Schools in Colorado Springs, Colorado
Public high schools in Colorado
High schools in Colorado Springs, Colorado
Public middle schools in Colorado
Public elementary schools in Colorado